Sabel may refer to:

 Sabel (TV series), a Philippine soap opera
 Sabel (surname), a Germanic surname
 Sabel (film), a 2004 Philippine film
 Antonette Ruth Sabel (1894-1974), music educator

See also
 Sable (disambiguation)